Gwriad ap Elidyr or Gwriad Manaw was a late-8th century figure in Wales. Very little is known of him, and he chiefly appears in the historical record in connection to his son Merfyn Frych, King of Gwynedd from around 825 to 844 and founder of the Merfynion dynasty.

Background
Almost nothing is known about Gwriad's background. He married Ethyllt ferch Cynan, daughter of Cynan Dindaethwy, King of Gwynedd. Their son Merfyn Frych later became the first king of Gwynedd known not to have come from the dynasty of its founder Cunedda. Merfyn evidently claimed the throne through his mother rather than through Gwriad, and bolstered this atypical matrilineal claim through his own power and reputation. According to the genealogies from Jesus College MS 20, Gwriad was the son of a certain Elidyr and was a descendant of Llywarch Hen and Coel Hen, rulers from the Hen Ogledd or "Old North", the Brittonic-speaking parts of what is now southern Scotland and northern England. The bardic poetry indicates that Merfyn was "from the land of Manaw", a Brittonic place name applied to several districts, including Manaw Gododdin, the area around the Firth of Forth. This locale in the Hen Ogledd would be consistent with Gwriad's descent from Llywarch's northern lineage. An origin in Manaw Gododdin was supported by scholars such as William Forbes Skene and John Edward Lloyd.

Other scholars connect Gwriad to the Isle of Man, known in Welsh as Ynis Manaw rather than Manaw Gododdin, especially following the 1896 discovery of an 8th- or 9th-century cross on Man inscribed Crux Guriat ("Cross of Gwriad"). Lloyd wrote that this discovery "undoubtedly strengthens the case" for a Manx origin. John Rhys suggested that Gwriad may have taken refuge on the Isle of Man during the bloody dynastic struggle in Gwynedd between Cynan Dindaethwy and Hywel prior to Merfyn's accession to the throne. Still other locations for "Manaw" have been suggested, including Ireland, Galloway and Powys.

Rhys further noted that the Welsh Triads mention a "Gwryat son of Gwryan in the North", counted among the "Three Kings who were the Sons of Strangers", which he suggests is a reference to the father of Merfyn. However, this conflicts with the Jesus College MS 20 pedigree, in which Gwriad's father is Elidyr. James E. Fraser suggests that the Gwriad of the Triad is instead to be identified with the King Guret of Alt Clut recorded by the Annals of Ulster as dying in 658.

See also
 Rhodri the Great
 House of Aberffraw
 House of Dinefwr

References

Monarchs of the Isle of Man
8th-century Welsh monarchs